The 2021 Philippine Cup, also known as the 2021 Honda PBA Philippine Cup for sponsorship reasons, was the first conference of the 2021 PBA season of the Philippine Basketball Association (PBA). The 43rd PBA Philippine Cup started on July 16, 2021, and ended on October 29, 2021. The tournament did not allow teams to hire foreign players or imports.

On August 3, the league announced that it will be suspending their games beginning August 4 after the government declared that Metro Manila will be under Enhanced Community Quarantine from August 6 to 20. The league have appealed to the Inter-Agency Task Force for the Management of Emerging Infectious Diseases (IATF-EID) if they can continue their tournament in Batangas, which is under a more relaxed quarantine restrictions.

On August 31, the tournament resumed and the games were played Don Honorio Ventura State University Gymnasium in Bacolor, Pampanga.

Format
The following format will be observed for the duration of the conference:
 Single-round robin eliminations; 11 games per team; Teams are then seeded by basis on win–loss records.
Top eight teams will advance to the quarterfinals. In case of tie, playoff games will be held only for the #8 seed.
Quarterfinals:
QF1: #1 vs #8 (#1 twice-to-beat)
QF2: #2 vs #7 (#2 twice-to-beat)
QF3: #3 vs #6 (best-of-3 series)
QF4: #4 vs #5 (best-of-3 series)
Semifinals (best-of-7 series):
SF1: QF1 Winner vs. QF4 Winner
SF2: QF2 Winner vs. QF3 Winner
Finals (best-of-7 series)
F1: SF1 Winner vs SF2 Winner

Elimination round

Team standings

Schedule

Results

Eighth seed playoff

Postponed games due to COVID-19
 July 21: Terrafirma vs. Alaska and TNT vs. Magnolia
 July 23: Rain or Shine vs. Terrafirma
 July 24: Meralco vs. TNT
 July 31: Blackwater vs. Phoenix
 August 1: San Miguel vs. Barangay Ginebra
 September 4: Alaska vs. San Miguel
 September 5: Meralco vs. Barangay Ginebra

Bracket

Quarterfinals

(1) TNT vs. (8) Barangay Ginebra 
TNT has the twice-to-beat advantage; they have to be beaten twice, while their opponents just once, to advance.

(2) Meralco vs (7) NLEX 
Meralco has the twice-to-beat advantage; they have to be beaten twice, while their opponents just once, to advance.

(3) Magnolia vs (6) Rain or Shine 
This is a best-of-three playoff.

(4) San Miguel vs (5) NorthPort 
This is a best-of-three playoff.

Semifinals
All match-ups are best-of-seven playoffs.

(1) TNT vs. (4) San Miguel

(2) Meralco vs. (3) Magnolia

Finals
The Finals is a best-of-seven playoff.

Awards

Players of the Week

Statistics

Individual statistical leaders

Individual game highs

Team statistical leaders

References

Philippine Cup
PBA Philippine Cup
PBA Philippine Cup 2021